Always may refer to:

Film and television
 Always, a 1985 film directed by Henry Jaglom
 Always (1989 film), a 1989 romantic comedy-drama directed by Steven Spielberg
 Always (2011 film), a 2011 South Korean film, also known as Only You
 Always Sanchōme no Yūhi or Always: Sunset on Third Street, a 2005 Japanese drama film, and a sequel
 "Always" (Castle), an episode of Castle
 "Always" (Dead Like Me), an episode of Dead Like Me
 "Always" (Friday Night Lights), an episode of Friday Night Lights
 "Always" (NASCAR Racers), an episode of NASCAR Racers

Music

Albums
 Always (Aziza Mustafa Zadeh album) or the title instrumental, 1993
 Always (Chris Tomlin album) or the title song (see below), 2022
 Always (Gabrielle album) or the title song, 2007
 Always (The Gathering album) or the title song, 1992
 Always (Hazell Dean album), 1988
 Always (Patsy Cline album), 1980
 Always (Pebbles album) or the title song, 1990
 Always (Willie Nelson album), 1980
 Always (Xiu Xiu album), 2012
 Always: The Very Best of Erasure or the 1994 title song (see below), 2015
 Always, by June Tabor, 2005
 Always, by Kelli O'Hara, 2011
 Always, by Michael Ball, 1993
 Always, by Tin Tin Out, 1998

EPs
 Always (Big Bang EP) or the title song, 2007
 Always (Panama EP) or the title song, 2013

Songs
 "Always" (Atlantic Starr song), 1987
 "Always" (Aysel and Arash song), 2009
 "Always" (Blink-182 song), 2004
 "Always" (Bon Jovi song), 1994
 "Always" (Chris Tomlin song), 2022
 "Always" (Erasure song), 1994
 "Always" (Irving Berlin song), 1925; recorded by many and used in the plot of Blithe Spirit
 "Always" (James Ingram song), 1986
 "Always" (Killswitch Engage song), 2013
 "Always" (Mai Kuraki song), 2001
 "Always" (Mika Nakashima song), 2010
 "Always" (MK song), 1992
 "Always" (Saliva song), 2002
 "Always" (Samantha Jade song), 2016
 "Always" (Switchfoot song), 2009
 "Always" (Trina song), 2010
 "Always", by Above & Beyond from Common Ground
 "Always", by Air Supply from News from Nowhere
 "Always", by Amon Tobin from Foley Room
 "Always", by Andy Grammer from The Good Parts
 "Always", by Bag Raiders from Bag Raiders
 "Always", by Bent from Programmed to Love
 "Always", by BT from These Hopeful Machines
 "Always", by Comeback Kid from Turn It Around
 "Always", by Corey Hart from Attitude & Virtue
 "Always", by David Guetta from Pop Life
 "Always", by Dennis Kamakahi from the soundtrack of the film Lilo & Stitch 2: Stitch Has a Glitch
 "Always", by Dope from American Apathy
 "Always", by Gavin James
 "Always", by Julian Lennon from Everything Changes
 "Always", by Kana Nishino
 "Always", by Madeline Kenney from Night Night at the First Landing
 "Always", by Maurice Williams and the Zodiacs from Stay with Maurice Williams & The Zodiacs
 "Always", by the Mighty Lemon Drops from Sound ... Goodbye to Your Standards
 "Always", by Misia from Kiss in the Sky
 "Always", by Panic! at the Disco from Vices & Virtues
 "Always", by Pet Shop Boys, a B-side of the single "Home and Dry"
 "Always", by Plumb from Blink
 "Always", by Real Life from Heartland
 "Always", by Rex Orange County from Pony
 "Always", by Seventh Day Slumber from Finally Awake
 "Always", by Shin Ji for the MMORPG Yogurting
 "Always", by Suede from Bloodsports
 "Always", by Sum 41 from All the Good Shit
 "Always", by U2, a B-side of the single "Beautiful Day"
 "Always", by the Veronicas from The Veronicas
 "Always (Outro)", by Bryson Tiller from True to Self

Other uses
 Always (brand), a brand of feminine hygiene products
 "Always" (short story), a 2007 short story by Karen Joy Fowler

See also

 
 
 Always, Always, a 1969 album by Porter Wagoner and Dolly Parton, and the title song
 Alvvays, a Canadian band
 Alvvays (album), by Alvvays, 2014
 Alway (disambiguation)
 "Always Somewhere", a 1979 song by Scorpions from Lovedrive
 Always on My Mind (disambiguation)
 Always Was (disambiguation)
 Forever and Always (disambiguation)